The 2011 Women's Australian Hockey League was the 19th edition of the women's field hockey tournament. The finals week of the tournament was held in the Northern Territory city of Darwin.

The Southern Suns won the gold medal for the second time by defeating the NSW Arrows 1–0 in the final.

Competition format

The format included five-round matches over two weekends and a finals week that consisted of two-round matches and three pool matches for a place in the final.

After all the round matches were complete the teams were ranked 1–8 depending on the total number of points earned in all their round matches.

The teams ranked 1, 4, 5 & 8 went into pool A and the teams ranked 2, 3, 6 & 7 went into pool B. All previously earned points were removed with the teams in each pool playing each other once more. At the completion of the pool matches the teams in each pool were ranked again 1–4 depending on the number of points accumulated, with the top team from each pool competing in the League Final and classification matches to determine the remaining six team's final positions.

Teams

  ACT Strikers
  Southern Suns

  NSW Arrows
  Tassie Van Demons

  NT Pearls
  VIC Vipers

  QLD Scorchers
  WA Diamonds

Venues

Results

Preliminary round

Round matches

Classification round

Pool matches

Pool A

Pool B

Classification matches

Seventh and eighth place

Fifth and sixth place

Third and fourth place

Final

Awards

Statistics

Final standings

Goalscorers

References

External links

2011
2011 in Australian women's field hockey